Dívka v modrém  is a 1939 Czech comedy film directed by Otakar Vávra.

Cast
 Lída Baarová as Vlasta/Countess Blanka of Blankenburg
 Oldřich Nový as Notary Jan Karas
 Růžena Šlemrová as Mrs. Smrčínská
 Sylva Langová as Slávinka Smrčínská
 Antonie Nedošinská as Housekeeper Otýlie
 Nataša Gollová as Růženka Smutná
 Bedřich Veverka as Doctor Pacovský
 František Paul as Forester Pavel Čádek
 František Kreuzmann as Knight Argnan
 Jindřich Láznička as Clerk Houžvička
 Eliška Pleyová as Fashion salon owner
 Vladimír Majer as Castle warden Kylián
 Vladimír Řepa as Landowner Kabelka
 Josef Bělský as Count Landa
 Jiří Vondrovič as Pharmacist's son
 Bolek Prchal as Record keeper
 Eman Fiala as Professor

References

External links
 

1939 films
1939 comedy films
Films directed by Otakar Vávra
Czech black-and-white films
Czech comedy films
1930s Czech films